Vottem is a village of Wallonia and a district of the municipality of Herstal, located in the province of Liège, Belgium.

The Rida river has its springs in Vottem.

It was a fully-fledged municipality up to 1976. The Jolivet and Bernalmont hamlets had already been transferred to the town of Liège in 1975.

Hamlets and neighbourhoods 
 Bouxhtay, Å Bouh'tè, Å Bouf'tè, hamlet mentioned since 1278
 Chapeauville, A chapêvêye, neighbourhood mentioned since 1534
 Cheval Blanc, Å blanc Dj'vå, after the "White Horse inn" that was located there
 Croix Jouette, Creû Djouwète, hamlet mentioned since 1552
 Gaillard-Cheval, Å Galiår, hamlet mentioned since 1530
 Gascogniers, Ås Cascognîs, hamlet mentioned since 1812 
 Haxhes, Hå, Håhe
 Haren, Harin
 Jolivet, è Djolivè (hamlet mentioned since 1430; transferred to Liège in 1975)
 Tiyou, after the Walloon word for the linden that was once growing there. There was also an old windmill, Moulin Bouquette which was destroyed around 1970 for sake of highway construction.

Geology and soils 

Vottem is at the limit of the Hesbaye Plateau and the Meuse valley. From higher to lower locations in the village, there are the following geological formations:
 Pleistocene aeolian loess 
 Tertiary sands (Oligocene)
 Clay with flint
 Maastrichtian chalk (Cretaceous) - it makes up the Hesbaye aquifer
 Herve clay or smectite 
 Sandstone, schists and coal pertaining to the Palaeozoic (also called Houiller)
Locally, near the Rida springs, freshwater tufa has been deposited.

Dominant soils in Vottem are well drained loamy soils(Ab) and gravelly loamy soils with silex, quite well drained also (Gb). The latter are directly related to outcrops of clay-with-flint. Remarkably, on the soil map, spring areas are not differentiated, most probably in relation to a low augering density (one per ha)

Important buildings 
 The Saint Étienne catholic church dates from 1788. It is a neo-classical church, holding a squared tower at the western side, in bricks and stone. It has been restored in 1966, and the old furniture disappeared at that time. One of the church bells dated from 1838,; it was stolen by the German occupier in 1943.
 Temple of the Antoinist cult

 Bouxthay Chapel (ruined)

 There used to be two windmills in Vottem, the Moulin Depireux and the Moulin Bouquette; their towers remained in the landscape until 1970, when they were destroyed to make room for the highway.
 The "Centre pour Illégaux de Vottem" (CIV) exists since 1999. Non-accepted asylum seekers reside here, before travelling back to their home country. People sleep in rooms with four beds.

Public footpaths

Vottem holds 26 km of public footpaths, out of which 14 km are in good shape, 2 km are difficult (often included in croplands), 1 km illegally closed, 2 km inaccessible with unknown status and 5 km have been officially abandoned (often for sake of highway construction). This high density of footpaths is explained by the previous dominance of horticulture in this village. The intensive work in the gardens required a lot of foot mobility; and the products were transported to the local auction market by hand carts; the width of the footpaths was adjusted to these carts: minimum 1.17 metres.

References

Herstal
Former municipalities of Liège Province